Solikha Khusniddinova (born 22 January 1998) is an Uzbekistani footballer who plays as a defender for Turkish Women's Football Super League club Kocaeli Bayan FK and the Uzbekistan women's national team.

Club career 
By mid December 2021, Khusniddinova moved to Turkey, and joined the Turkish Women's Super League club Kocaeli Bayan FK. By mid July 2022, she returned home.

International career 
Khusniddinova capped for Uzbekistan at senior level during the 2020 AFC Women's Olympic Qualifying Tournament.

International goals

See also 
List of Uzbekistan women's international footballers

References 

1998 births
Living people
People from Qashqadaryo Region
Uzbekistani women's footballers
Women's association football defenders
Uzbekistan women's international footballers
Uzbekistani expatriate footballers
Uzbekistani expatriate sportspeople in Turkey
Expatriate women's footballers in Turkey
Uzbekistani Muslims
Turkish Women's Football Super League players
Kocaeli Bayan FK players